Kazmalar may refer to:
Kazmalar, Khachmaz, Azerbaijan
Qazmalar, Azerbaijan
Köhnə Xudat Qazmalar, Azerbaijan